Gord Bamford (born April 17, 1976) is an Australian-Canadian country music singer. He has released ten studio albums. Alberta-raised Bamford stands as one of the most decorated artists in Canadian country music with 26 Canadian Country Music Association (CCMA) awards, along with multiple JUNO nominations. Additionally, Bamford is one of two multi-time winners of Nashville's Country Music Association (CMA) Global Country Artist of the Year award, along with the Shires.

Biography

Early years
Bamford was born in Traralgon, Victoria, Australia. When Bamford was five years old, he moved with his mother, Marilyn, from Australia to Lacombe, Alberta, Canada after his parents' divorce. A singer who toured with an Australian country band, Bamford's mother encouraged him to pursue a career in music. In 1995, Bamford entered and won the Nornet Radio Network's "Search for the Stars." With Rob Bartlett from Sundae Sound producing, Bamford went to Calgary to record his debut single, "Forever Starts Today," written by Dean McTaggart. The song received a positive response from Canadian country radio the following year.

2000–2002: God's Green Earth and hiatus
In January 2001, Bamford released his debut album, God's Green Earth, on his own GWB Records. The album was produced by Bart McKay at Sound Edge Productions in Saskatoon, Saskatchewan. Bamford wrote two songs on the album. Five songs were released from the project – "God's Green Earth," "24 x 24," "Where a Cowboy Likes to Roam," "Man of the House" and "Classic Country Song." The album didn't do as well as Bamford had expected and he left the business discouraged.

2003–2006: Life Is Good and nominations
In 2003, Bamford began spending time in Nashville, Tennessee writing with Steve Fox, Tim Taylor, and Byron Hill who went on to co-produce his second album. The album, Life Is Good, was released on October 19, 2004. Bamford wrote or co-wrote 10 of the 11 songs on the project. Six singles were released from the album, including the top 20 singles "Heroes," "My Heart's a Genius," "All About Her," "Life Is Good" and "I Would for You." A music video was shot for "All About Her," and reached No. 8 on CMT Canada's Chevy Top 20.

Over the next few years, Bamford opened shows for Tim McGraw, Kenny Rogers, Carolyn Dawn Johnson, Don Williams and Terri Clark. In both 2005 and 2006, he was nominated at the Canadian Country Music Awards for Independent Male Vocalist of the Year, Independent Song of the Year, and the Chevy Trucks Rising Star Award. On June 4, 2007, Bamford was one of only two Canadian artists invited to perform at the Global Artist Party at the CMA Music Festival in Nashville.

2007–2009: Honkytonks and Heartaches
Bamford's third album, Honkytonks and Heartaches, co-produced by Nashville producer Byron Hill, was released on September 25, 2007. The first single, "Blame It On That Red Dress," was Gord's first top 10 hit on the Canadian country singles chart and the music video, directed by award-winning director Stephano Barberis, reached No. 1 on CMT Canada's Chevy Top 20 for one week.

2010–2011: Day Job
Gord Bamford's fourth album, Day Job, co-produced by Nashville producer Byron Hill, was released in April 2010. Four singles were released from the album: "Day Job", "Put Some Alcohol On It", "My Daughter's Father" and "Hank Williams Lonesome".

2012–2013: Is It Friday Yet?
Bamford's fifth album, Is It Friday Yet?, co-produced by Nashville producer Byron Hill, was released in March 2012. Five singles were released from the album: "Is It Friday Yet?", "Leaning on a Lonesome Song", "Disappearing Tail Lights", "Farm Girl Strong" and "Must Be a Woman".

2013–2019: Country Junkie, Tin Roof, and Neon Smoke
Bamford's sixth album, Country Junkie, co-produced by Nashville producer Byron Hill, was released in October 2013. The album earned Bamford's first No. 1 single "When Your Lips Are So Close" (2013), a CRIA Gold Digital Single certification for "When Your Lips Are So Close" (2013), CCMA Single of the Year for "When Your Lips Are So Close" (2014), a Top-10 Country single ‘Unreal’ (2014), a Top-10 Country single ‘Where A Farm Used To Be’ (2014), a JUNO nomination for Country Album of the Year (2014), a fourth chart single "Groovin With You" (2015), CCMA Single of the Year for "Where A Farm Used To Be" (2015), and CCMA Song of the Year for "Where A Farm Used To Be" (2015).

In January 2018, Bamford released his eighth studio album Neon Smoke. It includes his second #1 Canada Country hit "Dive Bar", as well as collaborations with Jim Cuddy and Tracy Lawrence. He also performed at Casino Nova Scotia with Aaron Goodvin and Clay Walker.

2020–present: Diamonds in a Whiskey Glass and Fire It Up
In June 2021, Bamford released his ninth studio album Diamonds in a Whiskey Glass on Anthem Records and Cache Entertainment. It includes the singles "Diamonds in a Whiskey Glass" and "Heaven on Dirt". In November 2021, Bamford released the new single "Drink Along Song".

In January 2023, Bamford released the single "One Heartbeat From Heaven". It is the lead single off his upcoming tenth studio album Fire It Up.

Personal life
On August 30, 2004, Gord and his wife Kendra welcomed a boy, Nash David weighing in at 6 pounds, 7 ounces. They had a daughter, Paisley in 2006  and on July 31, 2009, they welcomed another daughter, Memphis Quinn.

Discography

God's Green Earth (2001)
Life Is Good (2004)
Honkytonks and Heartaches (2007)
Day Job (2010)
Is It Friday Yet? (2012)
Country Junkie (2013)
Tin Roof (2016)
Neon Smoke (2018)
Diamonds in a Whiskey Glass (2021)
Fire It Up (2023)

Awards and nominations

References

External links

Gord Bamford on Insta
Gord Bamford's philanthropic initiative The Gord Bamford Foundation

1976 births
Living people
21st-century Australian male singers
Australian country singer-songwriters
Canadian country singer-songwriters
Canadian male singer-songwriters
People from Traralgon
Australian emigrants to Canada
Canadian Country Music Association Male Artist of the Year winners
Canadian Country Music Association Songwriter(s) of the Year winners
Canadian Country Music Association Single of the Year winners
21st-century Canadian male singers
Anthem Records artists
Canadian Country Music Association Album of the Year winners